Ararat was an electoral district of the Legislative Assembly in the Australian state of Victoria. The electorate was abolished in 1904 and replaced by the electoral district of Stawell and Ararat.

Its area was defined as: 
This equivalent to approximately 30 km by 25.7 km.

Members for Ararat
Two members initially, one member from 1877.

External links
Ararat Electoral Roll 1859 at State Library of Victoria

References

Former electoral districts of Victoria (Australia)
1859 establishments in Australia
1904 disestablishments in Australia